A Katanga Cross, also called a handa, is a cast copper ingot in the shape of an equal-armed cross which was once used as a form of currency in parts of what is now the Democratic Republic of the Congo (DRC) in the 19th and early 20th centuries. The name derives from Katanga, a rich copper mining region in the south-eastern portion of the DRC.

These X-shaped ingots were cast by local coppersmiths by pouring molten copper into sand molds.

Original value
Ten would buy a gun.[Opitz-p.124]

Modern uses
In 1960, Katanga unilaterally seceded from the newly independent Congo-Léopoldville and declared its own independence as the State of Katanga. The Katanga state used the cross as a national symbol; three red katanga crosses appeared in the lower hoist of its flag. Coins issued by Katanga in 1961 also depicted the Katanga Cross. The State of Katanga was forcibly reunited with the Congo in 1963.

See also
Manillas

References

Further reading

Currencies of Africa
Democratic Republic of the Congo culture
Katanga Province
Currencies of the Democratic Republic of the Congo